Mount Arthur is a mountain in the northern region of Tasmania, Australia.

Toponymy 

Mount Arthur had been called Row Tor in the 1800s, although this name also applies on maps to nearby Mount Barrow. 
Later maps of the north-east show Row Tor as occupying the present day location of Mount Arthur. 
Row Tor is a homonym of Rough Tor, named for the eponymous mountain in Cornwall, England and not in reference to the mountain's shape, as is commonly supposed.

The first reference to 'Mount Arthur' (in north-east Tasmania) in the news appears in 1834, yet references to the same mountain as 'Row Tor' continue into the latter half of the century.

Mt Arthur is named for Lt-Governor Arthur, the chief administrator of Tasmania from 1823 and 1837.

History 
The summit cairn was built in the late 1800s as a survey marker for north-east Tasmania.

The area around the mountain was an important timber district early in Tasmanian colonial settlement.
From 1879, the Lisle valley, on the northern aspect of Mount Arthur, was the centre of gold mining and for twenty years the town of Lisle was a thriving commercial centre.  The town no longer exists apart from the remains of the town cemetery.
Due to its close proximity to Launceston its summit is home to a large number of radio towers. WayFM (105.3 and 98.1), Launceston, and Northern Tasmania's Christian community radio station, have their tower on Mount Arthur. It is also a popular destination for hikers.

In addition to this peak, there are two further minor peaks in Tasmania, also called Mount Arthur. One is located near Port Arthur; and the other is located near .

See also

 List of mountains in Tasmania

References

Mountains of Tasmania
Northern Tasmania